W.E.B. Du Bois: Biography of a Race, 1868–1919 is nonfiction book written by historian David Levering Lewis and published in 1993 by Henry Holt and Company. The book studies the early and middle years of Du Bois's life. It is the first in a two-part biography of W.E.B. Du Bois. It won the Pulitzer Prize for Biography in 1994, as did Lewis's second installment, W. E. B. Du Bois: The Fight for Equality and the American Century 1919-1963, winning the Pulitzer in 2001.

References

External links
Booknotes interview with Lewis on Biography of a Race

1993 non-fiction books
Pulitzer Prize for Biography or Autobiography-winning works
American biographies
Biographies about African-American people
Bancroft Prize-winning works
W. E. B. Du Bois